City of Fear may refer to:

City of Fear (1959 film), an American film directed by Irving Lerner
City of Fear (1965 film), a film directed by Peter Bezencenet
City of Fear, a 2000 film with Gary Daniels and Carol Campbell
City of Fear, a 2016 episode of Homicide Hunter: Lt. Joe Kenda
"City of Fear", a 1994 episode of Frontline 
La Cité de la peur, translated as The City of Fear, a 1994 French comedy
City of Fear (album), a 1980 album by FM